England Is a Garden is a studio album by British indie rock band Cornershop. It was released on 6 March 2020 under the band's own label, Ample Play Records.

The first single from the album, "No Rock: Save in Roll" was released on 26 November 2019.

Critical reception
England Is a Garden was met with universal acclaim reviews from critics. At Metacritic, which assigns a weighted average rating out of 100 to reviews from mainstream publications, this release received an average score of 82, based on 10 reviews.

AllMusic's Tim Sendra hailed England Is a Garden as Cornershop's "most cohesive and powerful record yet, full of songs that have a hearty punch to go along with their typically sharp hooks". Elisa Bray of The Independent found its "pan-cultural melting pot of juxtapositions" as "confrontational" and "musically ambitious" as the band's early work. Somewhat less impressed, Robert Christgau highlighted the songs "Everywhere That Wog Army Roam" and "The Cash Money" while offering as a summation that the band's singer and songwriter "Tjinder Singh fends off Brexit with his trademark hyperintelligent indirection, a tactic that doesn't work as well as it used to".

Track listing

Charts

References

2020 albums
Cornershop albums